Lieutenant General Oscar Woolverton Griswold (22 October 1886 – 28 September 1959) was a United States Army officer who served in the first half of the 20th century. He is best known for his command of the XIV Corps in the South Pacific Area and South West Pacific Area during World War II.

Early life
Oscar Woolverton Griswold was born on 22 October 1886 in Ruby Valley, Nevada. Raised in Arthur, Nevada, he attended the University of Nevada, Reno from 1905 to 1906, when he received an appointment to the United States Military Academy (USMA) at West Point, New York. On graduation with the West Point Class of 1910, he was commissioned a second lieutenant in the Infantry.

Military career
Griswold's early company grade assignments included three years service in China from 1914 to 1917. During World War I he served as a major and lieutenant colonel in the 84th Division, American Expeditionary Forces (AEF), from 1918 to 1919, and participated in the Meuse–Argonne offensive.

Griswold was assigned to the USMA from 1921 to 1924. He graduated from the United States Army Command and General Staff College in 1925, graduating 189th in the class of 258, and the United States Army War College in 1929. From 1929 to 1931 Griswold served with the War Department General Staff. This duty was followed by service with the United States Army Air Corps. He served as a member of the Infantry Board from 1932 to 1936, and from 1936 to 1939 was assigned to the Office, Chief of Infantry.

World War II
Griswold commanded the 29th Infantry Regiment from September 1939 to October 1940. The 29th was the primary training regiment permanently billeted at the Infantry School at Fort Benning, Georgia; under Griswold's command, the first Parachute Test Platoon was organized out of the 29th, as well as its ersatz successor, the original 501st Parachute Battalion. Griswold was promoted to brigadier general in October 1940 and became Commanding General of the Infantry Replacement Training Center at Camp Croft. Promoted to major general in August 1941, he commanded 4th Infantry Division.

From April 1943, Griswold was Commanding General of the XIV Corps, which fought in New Georgia, Bougainville and in the Philippines. It was for his service during this period that he was awarded the Navy Distinguished Service Medal, the citation for which reads:

He was promoted to lieutenant general in early 1945, and continued to serve in the Pacific theater under Douglas MacArthur during the Battle of Manila in February 1945. Griswold was the top ground commander only under MacArthur and Krueger during that battle, which was the largest urban warfare American troops ever participated in up to that point; Griswold's XIV Corps, in their bitter and bloody fight for Manila, consisted of the 1st Cavalry Division, the 37th Infantry Division, and the 11th Airborne Division. In June 1945, General of the Army MacArthur nominated Griswold to command the Tenth United States Army following the death of Lieutenant General Simon Bolivar Buckner, Jr. in the Battle of Okinawa. However, he was passed over in favor of General Joseph Stilwell.

Later life
After World War II, Griswold served as Commanding General of the Seventh United States Army from 11 June 1946 to 15 March 1947, and then the Third United States Army from 15 March to 14 April 1947.

In October 1947, Griswold retired to The Broadmoor resort in Colorado Springs, Colorado, and resided in the Broadmoor Stadium Apartments. In 1948, he was employed by The Broadmoor Hotel Corporation as the Director of Athletic Events. These included ice hockey and figure skating in the Broadmoor Ice Palace. In 1954, Griswold helped to bring the new United States Air Force Academy to Colorado Springs. He also appeared in a television segment of This Is Your Life in December 1956 where he lauded the exploits of an army captain who refused to surrender in the Philippines and successfully led a guerilla campaign against the Japanese until he turned himself in to General Griswold. He remained employed by the Broadmoor until health problems caused him to retire.

Griswold died on 28 September 1959 at his home in Colorado Springs. He was buried along with his wife Elizabeth Katherine (Matile) Griswold at the West Point Cemetery.

Awards
Griswold's awards and decorations include the following:

In 1946 he received a Doctor of Laws from the University of Nevada, Reno.

Dates of rank

References

1886 births
1959 deaths
United States Army Infantry Branch personnel
People from Elko County, Nevada
University of Nevada, Reno alumni
United States Military Academy alumni
Military personnel from Nevada
United States Army personnel of World War I
United States Military Academy faculty
United States Army Command and General Staff College alumni
United States Army War College alumni
United States Army generals of World War II
Recipients of the Air Medal
Recipients of the Silver Star
Recipients of the Legion of Merit
United States Army generals
Recipients of the Distinguished Service Medal (US Army)
Recipients of the Navy Distinguished Service Medal
People from Colorado Springs, Colorado
Burials at West Point Cemetery